Timothy Robert Maurer (born October 10, 1980) is an American singer, best known as the former lead singer of third-wave ska band Suburban Legends. He has left the band on two occasions. The first was in 2000 after the recording of Origin Edition. He rejoined the band in early 2002 after his replacement singer Chris Batstone left the band. He officially left the band again in September 2005 after the band's third consecutive appearance on the Jerry Lewis MDA Telethon, performing a new song entitled "Moving Closer." The band's former trumpet player, Vincent Walker, rejoined the band for the performance, then took over as lead singer afterward. Maurer returned for a final performance with the band on November 29, 2005 at Huntington Beach High School for a benefit show for the Ryan Dallas Cook Memorial Fund, which was set up following the death of Suburban Legends' trombonist Dallas Cook.

Maurer has one son and he is the brother of Chris Maurer, who played bass in the band before his departure. In 2009, Maurer performed in a Britpop tribute group called PopBritannica, along with past members of Save Ferris. Maurer appeared with ska group Starpool at DiPiazza's in Long Beach on May 28, 2010, performing guest lead vocals on covers of The Specials' "Nite Klub" and "Little Bitch."

References 

1980 births
Living people
American ska singers
American punk rock singers
Suburban Legends members
21st-century American singers
21st-century American male singers